Heinz Donhauser  (22 June 1951 in Amberg)  is a German politician, representative of the Christian Social Union of Bavaria. He is a member of the Landtag of Bavaria.

See also
List of Bavarian Christian Social Union politicians

References

Christian Social Union in Bavaria politicians
1951 births
Living people